Ryan Wiradinata (born 13 July 1990) is an Indonesian professional footballer who plays as a defensive midfielder for Liga 1 club Persikabo 1973.

Club career

Persela Lamongan
He was signed for Persela Lamongan to play in Liga 1 in the 2020 season. This season was suspended on 27 March 2020 due to the COVID-19 pandemic. The season was abandoned and was declared void on 20 January 2021.

Muba Babel United
In 2021, Wiradinata signed a contract with Indonesian Liga 2 club Muba Babel United. He made his league debut on 6 October against Sriwijaya at the Gelora Sriwijaya Stadium, Palembang.

References

External links
 Ryan Wiradinata at Soccerway
 Ryan Wiradinata at Liga Indonesia

1990 births
Living people
Indonesian footballers
Indonesian Premier Division players
Liga 2 (Indonesia) players
Liga 1 (Indonesia) players
PS Mojokerto Putra players
Persipal Palu players
PS TIRA players
Sriwijaya F.C. players
Persela Lamongan players
Muba Babel United F.C. players
Persikabo 1973 players
Association football midfielders
People from Palu
Sportspeople from Central Sulawesi